Billy Baum (born 17 November 1946) is a Puerto Rican former basketball player who competed in the 1972 Summer Olympics.

References

1946 births
Living people
Puerto Rican men's basketball players
Olympic basketball players of Puerto Rico
Basketball players at the 1972 Summer Olympics
Basketball players at the 1971 Pan American Games
Pan American Games silver medalists for Puerto Rico
Pan American Games medalists in basketball
Medalists at the 1971 Pan American Games